This list of tallest buildings in Thrissur ranks the high-rises in Thrissur, Kerala, India. Thrissur is witnessing a huge high-rise boom with many skyscrapers getting built in different parts of the city.

Sobha Topaz in Sobha City is the tallest building in the city. It rises to a height of 97.90 from the ground comprising a total of 28 floors including a helipad.

This lists ranks buildings in Thrissur that stand at least 60 metres (198 feet) or 16 floors. This includes spires and architectural details but does not include antenna masts. Only completed buildings and under-construction buildings that have been topped out are included.

See also 
 List of tallest buildings in India

References

Buildings, tallest
Tallest
Thrissur